Miburani is an administrative ward in the Temeke district of the Dar es Salaam Region of Tanzania. The ward is home to the Benjamin Mkapa Stadium and Uhuru Stadium the former being the  largest stadium in the country and the latter being the most historic.  According to the 2002 census, the ward has a total population of 41,176.

References

Temeke District
Wards of Dar es Salaam Region